The 2017–18 Chicago Blackhawks season was the 92nd season for the National Hockey League franchise that was established on September 25, 1926. The Blackhawks finished the season with 76 points (19 points out of the final playoff spot) to finish in last place in the Central Division of the Western Conference. The season marked the first time since 2008 where the Blackhawks failed to make the Stanley Cup playoffs and the team's worst regular season performance since 2007.

Prior to the season, the Blackhawks made several moves in an attempt to make up for the prior season's playoff disappointment. As a result, the team traded their second-leading goal scorer from the prior season, Artemi Panarin, to the Columbus Blue Jackets for former Blackhawk Brandon Saad. In addition, the team traded arguably their most reliable defenseman, Niklas Hjalmarsson, to the Arizona Coyotes for defenseman Connor Murphy. Numerous other moves were made in an attempt to change the team. Also, forward Marian Hossa announced he would not play for the Blackhawks during the season due to a skin condition that was aggravated by wearing hockey equipment. As a result, Hossa was placed on long-term injured reserve.

Patrick Kane led the team in scoring with 76 points while rookie forward Alex DeBrincat led the team in goals with 28. The Blackhawks had five players score 20 or more goals: DeBrincat, Kane (27), Nick Schmaltz (21), Artem Anisimov (20) and Jonathan Toews (20). Goalie Corey Crawford only played 28 games, missing the final 47 games of the season with an undisclosed injury.

Despite the disappointing season, team president John McDonough announced that general manager Stan Bowman and coach Joel Quenneville would return for the 2018–19 season.

Standings

Schedule and results

Pre-season
The Blackhawks published their preseason schedule on June 8, 2017.

Regular season
The Blackhawks released their regular season schedule on June 22, 2017.

Detailed records

Player statistics
Final Stats

Skaters

Goaltenders

†Denotes player spent time with another team before joining Blackhawks. Stats reflect time with Blackhawks only. 
‡Left team mid-season. Stats reflect time with Blackhawks only.

Awards and honours

Awards

Milestones

Transactions
The Blackhawks have been involved in the following transactions during the 2017–18 season.

Trades

Free agents acquired

Free agents lost

Claimed via waivers

Lost via waivers

Players released

Lost via retirement

Player signings

Draft picks

Below are the Chicago Blackhawks' selections at the 2017 NHL Entry Draft, which was held on June 23 and 24, 2017 at the United Center in Chicago.

Notes:
 The Anaheim Ducks' first-round pick went to the Chicago Blackhawks as the result of a trade on June 23, 2017, that sent a first-round pick in 2017 (26th overall) to Dallas in exchange for a third-round pick in 2017 (70th overall) and this pick.
 The Dallas Stars' third-round pick went to the Chicago Blackhawks as the result of a trade on June 23, 2017, that sent a first-round pick in 2017 (26th overall) to Dallas in exchange for Anaheim's first-round pick in 2017 (29th overall) and this pick.
 The Ottawa Senators' third-round pick went to the Chicago Blackhawks as the result of a trade on April 28, 2017, that sent Scott Darling to Carolina in exchange for this pick.
 The San Jose Sharks' fourth-round pick went to the Chicago Blackhawks as the result of a trade on June 24, 2017, that sent Carolina's fifth-round pick and a sixth-round pick both in 2017 (135th and 181st overall) to Vancouver in exchange for this pick.
 The St. Louis Blues' fifth-round pick went to the Chicago Blackhawks as the result of a trade on June 25, 2016, that sent a Florida's fifth-round pick in 2016 to St. Louis in exchange for this pick.
 The Anaheim Ducks' seventh-round pick went to the Chicago Blackhawks as the result of a trade on February 29, 2016, that sent Corey Tropp to Anaheim in exchange for Tim Jackman and this pick.

References

2017-18
2017–18 NHL season by team
Chicago Blackhawks
Chicago Blackhawks
2010s in Chicago
2017 in Illinois
Chicago Blackhawks